Dêqên, or Deqing in Chinese, is a town and the seat of Dagzê District, Lhasa, Tibet Autonomous Region, China.

Footnotes

Populated places in Lhasa (prefecture-level city)
Dagzê County
Township-level divisions of Tibet